Owshendel (also Romanized as Owshendel and Ūshendel; also known as Uchdal) is a village in Kuhsar Rural District of the Central District of Hashtrud County, East Azerbaijan province, Iran. At the 2006 National Census, its population was 891 in 199 households. The following census in 2011 counted 897 people in 255 households. The latest census in 2016 showed a population of 853 people in 262 households; it was the largest village in its rural district.

References 

Hashtrud County

Populated places in East Azerbaijan Province

Populated places in Hashtrud County